Darren Lee Smith (born 27 March 1988) is a Scottish professional footballer who is a free agent.

Smith represented the Scotland national under-21 football team once and played nearly 60 Scottish Premier League (SPL) games for Motherwell. He has also played for Ross County, Stenhousemuir, Stirling Albion, Clyde, Edinburgh City and East Kilbride onloan.

Early life
Smith was born in Lanark and attended Carluke High School in South Lanarkshire.

Club career

Motherwell
Smith started his football career at boyhood heroes Motherwell, and became one of their youngest ever players when he made his debut aged 16, appearing as a substitute against Inverness CT in the 2004–05 season. It would be the 2005–06 season before he would feature in the team again, coming on as a substitute as Motherwell defeated Falkirk 5–0. A few days later, he scored his first goal for the club against St Mirren in the League Cup. He then suffered an injury which ruled him out for the rest of the season.

The 2006–07 season was a more prolific one for Smith. Despite this being an unsuccessful season for Motherwell, who finished 10th in the SPL, Smith made 13 starts and 6 substitute appearances, scoring three goals. The first and most notable of his goals was a last minute equaliser against Celtic on 30 December 2006.

The 2007–08 season was Smith's most successful in his time at Motherwell so far, as Motherwell finished 3rd in the SPL and qualified for the UEFA Cup. He made 27 appearances, scoring four goals. Two came against Aberdeen in the SPL, the second being the opener in the 2–1 victory on 10 May that effectively sealed Motherwell's UEFA Cup qualification.

Smith found himself on the fringes of the first team in the 2008–09 season, making only one start and failing to find the net. At the start of the 2009–10 season, he was forced to have hip surgery after tearing cartilage during pre-season.

Smith spent a month on loan at Stenhousemuir in early 2010, but played only twice due to injury.

Smith was released by Motherwell at the end of the 2009–10 season.

Ross County
After leaving Motherwell, Smith had a trial at Inverness Caledonian Thistle. He then signed for Ross County on a one-year deal. Manager Derek Adams commented that "Darren is a young player with a lot of potential as well as a lot of experience. I'm delighted that after his trial period we have been able to reach an agreement with him."

Stirling Albion
On 28 July 2011, Smith signed for Stirling Albion of the Second Division after being released by Ross County. He left the club in May 2012.

Stenhousemuir
Smith signed for Stenhousemuir during the 2012 summer transfer window.

Stirling Albion
In June 2014, Smith signed for Stirling Albion for a second time. In January 2016, he was named as Scottish League Two Player of the Month for December 2015. On 9 February 2016, in Stirling Albion's 7–0 win against Montrose, Smith scored a hat-trick in the space of four minutes.

Smith won two more Player of the Month awards during the 2017–18 season, in August and December. At the end of the season he was voted PFA Scotland League Two Player of the Season.

Clyde
On 24 May 2019, Smith signed for Clyde on a one-year contract.

East Kilbride 
Lowland League club East Kilbride announced the signing of Smith on 15 July 2020. Smith was loaned to Edinburgh City in March 2021.

International career
Smith made his debut for the Scotland under-21s in the spring of 2007, playing the second half of a 2–0 defeat against the Germany under-21s. He also played for his country at under-19 and under-20 level.

Career statistics

References

External links

1988 births
Living people
Sportspeople from Lanark
People educated at Carluke High School
Scottish footballers
Association football wingers
Scotland under-21 international footballers
Motherwell F.C. players
Stenhousemuir F.C. players
Ross County F.C. players
Stirling Albion F.C. players
Clyde F.C. players
Scottish Premier League players
Scottish Football League players
Scottish Professional Football League players
Footballers from South Lanarkshire
People from Carluke